Loango may refer to:

Places 
 Loango, Republic of Congo, a town in the Republic of the Congo
Loango slavery harbour is a Republic of the Congo cultural site included in World Heritage Tentative Lists in 2008
 Loango National Park, a national park in Western Gabon
 Petit Loango, a town in Gabon
 Kingdom of Loango, a pre-colonial state in what is now the Republic of the Congo
 Loango, Alabama

Other 
 Loango (schooner), a schooner wrecked in 1909 at St Ives, Cornwall
 Loango weaver (Ploceus subpersonatus), a species of bird